Blue City Slammers is a 1987 Canadian drama film directed by Peter Shatalow. Based on the theatrical play by Layne Coleman, the film centres on the personal and sport lives of the players on a women's softball team in the small town of Blue City. The cast includes Tracy Cunningham, Eric Keenleyside, Fran Gebhard, Gary Farmer, Murray Westgate and Gabriel Hogan.

The film garnered three Genie Award nominations at the 9th Genie Awards in 1988: Best Supporting Actor (Westgate), Best Supporting Actress (Gebhard) and Best Original Score (Tim McCauley).

References

External links

1987 films
1980s sports drama films
Canadian sports drama films
English-language Canadian films
Films based on Canadian plays
1987 drama films
1980s English-language films
1980s Canadian films